Giuseppe Pafundi (born 4 December 1883)  was a general in the Royal Italian Army who commanded the XVII Corps during the World War II Axis invasion of Yugoslavia in April 1941.

Career

Promotions

1934-09-05 	Brigadier-General

1937-07-01 	Major-General

Service

1926: Commanding Officer 63rd Infantry Regiment "Cagliari"

1933: Eritrea Commanding Officer 20th Brigade

1938-1939: General Officer Commanding 25th Infantry Division "Volturno"

1939-1940: General Officer Commanding 25th Infantry Division "Bologna"

1940-1941: General Officer Commanding XVII Corps

1941: General Officer Commanding Armoured Corps

1941-1942: General Officer Commanding VIII Corps

Notes

References
 

Italian generals
1883 births
Year of death missing
Italian occupation of Greece during World War II